Borsukowizna refers to the following places in Poland:

 Borsukowizna, Białystok County
 Borsukowizna, Sokółka County